Genevieve Tobin (November 29, 1899 – July 31, 1995) was an American actress.

Early years
Tobin was born in New York City on November 29, 1899. Her father, Thomas Tobin, a bank clerk who later became a racetrack bookmaker, was born in Nova Scotia, Canada and her mother, Genevieve, was born in Washington, D.C. She had a sister, Vivian, and a brother, George.

Career
Tobin's stage debut came in 1912 in Disraeli. She appeared in a few films as a child and formed a double act with her sister Vivian. Their brother, George, also had a brief acting career. Following her education in Paris and New York, Tobin concentrated on a stage career in New York.

Although she was seen most often in comedies, she also played the role of Cordelia in a Broadway production of King Lear in 1923. Popular with audiences, she was often praised by critics for her appearance and style rather than for her talent, but in 1929, she achieved a significant success in the play Fifty Million Frenchmen. She introduced and popularized the Cole Porter song "You Do Something to Me", and the success of the role led her back to Hollywood, where she performed regularly in comedy films from the early 1930s.

She played prominent supporting roles opposite such performers as Jeanette MacDonald, Nelson Eddy, Cary Grant, Barbara Stanwyck, Claudette Colbert, Joan Blondell, and Kay Francis, but occasionally played starring roles, in films such as Golden Harvest (1933) and Easy to Love (1934). She played secretary Della Street to Warren William's Perry Mason in The Case of the Lucky Legs (1935). One of her most successful performances was as the bored wife of a wealthy businessman in the drama The Petrified Forest (1936), starring Leslie Howard, Bette Davis, and Humphrey Bogart.

She married director William Keighley in 1938 and made only a few more films; her final film before retirement was No Time for Comedy (1940), with James Stewart and Rosalind Russell.

She remained married to Keighley until his death in 1984.

Partial filmography

 Uncle Tom's Cabin (1910, Short) - Eva
 The Country Cousin (1919) - Eleanor Howitt
 No Mother to Guide Her (1923) - Mary Boyd
 Free Love (1930) - Mary
 A Lady Surrenders (1930) - Hope Ferrier
 Fires of Youth (1931) - Mildred
 Seed (1931) - Myra Deane
 The Gay Diplomat (1931) - Countess Diana Dorchy
 One Hour with You (1932) - Mitzi Olivier
 The Cohens and Kellys in Hollywood (1932) - Himself
 Hollywood Speaks (1932) - Gertie Smith / Greta Swan
 Perfect Understanding (1933) - Kitty Drayton
 Pleasure Cruise (1933) - Shirley Poole
 Infernal Machine (1933) - Elinor Green
 The Wrecker (1933) - Mary Regan
 Goodbye Again (1933) - Julie Wilson
 Golden Harvest (1933) - Cynthia Flint
 I Loved a Woman (1933) - Martha Lane
 Easy to Love (1934) - Carol
 Dark Hazard (1934) - Marge Mayhew Turner
 The Ninth Guest (1934) - Jean Trent
 Success at Any Price (1934) - Agnes
 Uncertain Lady (1934) - Doris Crane
 Kiss and Make-Up (1934) - Eve Caron
 By Your Leave (1934) - Ellen Smith
 The Woman in Red (1935) - Mrs. 'Nicko' Nicholas
 Here's to Romance (1935) - Kathleen Gerard
 The Goose and the Gander (1935) - Betty
 The Case of the Lucky Legs (1935) - Della Street
 Broadway Hostess (1935) - Iris
 The Petrified Forest (1936) - Mrs. Chisholm
 Snowed Under (1936) - Alice Merritt
 The Man in the Mirror (1936) - Helen
 The Great Gambini (1937) - Nancy Randall
 The Call of the Ring (1937) - Pauline Corbin
 Kate Plus Ten (1938) - Kate Westhanger
 Dramatic School (1938) - Gina Bertier
 Zaza (1939) - Florianne
 Yes, My Darling Daughter (1939) - Connie Nevins
 Our Neighbors - The Carters (1939) - Gloria Hastings
 No Time for Comedy (1940) - Amanda Swift (final film role)

References

Chaneles, Sol; Albert Wolsky (1974). The Movie Makers Octopus Books, p 97. 
The New York Times - Movies, accessed June 8, 2007

External links

Photographs of Genevieve Tobin

American film actresses
American stage actresses
1899 births
1995 deaths
Actresses from New York City
American child actresses
20th-century American actresses
Warner Bros. contract players